The small-billed elaenia (Elaenia parvirostris) is a species of bird in the family Tyrannidae.

It is found in Argentina, Aruba, Bolivia, Brazil, Colombia, Ecuador, French Guiana, Guyana, Netherlands Antilles, Paraguay, Peru, Suriname, Trinidad and Tobago, Uruguay, and Venezuela. Its natural habitats are subtropical or tropical dry forest, subtropical or tropical moist lowland forest, and heavily degraded former forest. Four sightings have been recorded in the United States.

References

small-billed elaenia
Birds of the Pampas
Birds of Paraguay
Birds of Brazil
Birds of Argentina
small-billed elaenia
small-billed elaenia
Taxonomy articles created by Polbot